Klub Sportowy GKS Jastrzębie Spółka Akcyjna, commonly known as GKS Jastrzębie, is a football club based in Jastrzębie-Zdrój, Poland. As of the 2022–23 season, they will compete in II liga, after suffering relegation the previous season. In the 1988–89 season they played in the top-flight.

Name 
On 25 November 2021, the club announced the change of the club's name to "Klub Sportowy GKS Jastrzębie Spółka Akcyjna", removing the element of 1962 from the name.

Current squad 
As of 3 March, 2022

Out on loan

References

External links
Official Website 

Football clubs in Silesian Voivodeship
Association football clubs established in 1962
1962 establishments in Poland
Sport in Jastrzębie-Zdrój
Jastrzębie